Migmacastor is an extinct member of the beaver family, Castoridae, known from a single species, Migmacastor procumbodens. Only a single specimen has been reported, a skull from the late Oligocene or early Miocene of Nebraska. Features of the incisor teeth of Migmacastor indicate they were used to dig. Other extinct beavers, including the better-known Palaeocastor, were also fossorial (digging), but Migmacastor may have become a burrower independently.

References

Prehistoric beavers
Oligocene rodents
Miocene rodents
Cenozoic mammals of North America
Prehistoric monotypic mammal genera
Prehistoric rodent genera